Amber Jean Brooks (born January 23, 1991) is an American professional soccer player who plays as a defender for Washington Spirit in the National Women's Soccer League (NWSL). She has previously played for Adelaide United, Houston Dash, OL Reign, Portland Thorns, Bayern Munich, and Vancouver Whitecaps.

Brooks has represented the United States as member of numerous youth national teams and has one cap with the senior national team.

Early life
Brooks was born in Evansville, Indiana and attended Pennington School in New Jersey. She scored 62 goals and had 30 assists during her first three years for a total of 154 points. She did not play as a senior due to a knee injury and National Team commitments. Brooks was named first-team All-County and a Parade Magazine All-America as a junior after she helped the team finish the 2008 season undefeated at 18–0, winning its sixth straight Prep-A state championship and its third MCT Championship in five years. Pennington was ranked by the NSCAA and ESPN Rise as the number one team in the nation the same year. Brooks was awarded the 2008 NSCAA Girls' Scholar Athlete of the Year Award and was ranked by ESPN Rise as the number one recruit in the nation in 2009.

University of North Carolina

Brooks was captain of the University of North Carolina Tar Heels women's soccer team her junior and senior year (2011–2012).  She accrued several accolades during her four years with the Tar Heels, becoming a two-time NCAA National Champion and winning the College Cup in 2009 and in 2012.  She scored 34 goals and added 19 assists during her college career.

Club career

Vancouver Whitecaps, 2011
During the summer of 2011, Brooks played for the Vancouver Whitecaps in the W-League. She made five appearances, playing 391 minutes, and provided one assist.

Bayern Munich, 2013–2015
On January 11, 2013, Brooks signed with German club, Bayern Munich in the Bundesliga until June 30, 2014.
In her first Bundesliga game against SGS Essen, she scored two goals, including the game-winning goal in the 90th minute.

Portland Thorns, 2013–2014
Brooks was drafted by Portland Thorns on January 18, 2013, during the 2013 National Women's Soccer League College Draft.  Her debut came while visiting the Houston Dash in which she played the entirety of the 1–0 victory.  She would go on to start another 19 matches for the club in addition to a solitary substitution appearance.  Brooks collected her first and only goal for the Thorns during the season while adding two assists, though her primary contributions were on the defensive end of the field where her ferocity led to a team-leading four yellow cards on the season.  After the conclusion of the Thorns 2014 season, the team announced that she would be on loan to her previous side Bayern Munich and become the second Portland member to be headed to Germany after the 2014 season, following teammate Veronica Boquete to the Bundesliga.  While Portland initially indicated that Brooks would be re-signed for the 2015 National Women's Soccer League season, she was instead traded to the Western New York Flash on November 6, 2014, in exchange for midfielder McCall Zerboni and defender Kathryn Williamson.

Seattle Reign, 2015
In March 2015, Brooks was traded to Seattle Reign along with the rights to Abby Wambach in exchange for Sydney Leroux and Amanda Frisbie. She made twelve appearances and scored one goal for Seattle.

Houston Dash, 2015–2019
On October 26, 2015, Brooks was traded to the Houston Dash in exchange for Meghan Klingenberg and a conditional selection in the 2017 NWSL College Draft from Seattle Reign. Brooks had her contract option exercised for the 2017 season.  She was named the 2017 Dash MVP and played all 2,160 minutes of the regular season, scored one goal and tallied two assists, captaining the side eight times.  She was then re-signed for the 2018 season.  Brooks was named 2018 Dash Defender of the Year. The club has exercised her contract option for the 2019 season. On April 14, 2019, Brooks played in her 100th career NWSL game, becoming the 22nd player to reach that mark.

Loan to Adelaide United
Brooks signed with Adelaide United for the 2018–19 W-League season, alongside Houston Dash teammate Veronica Latsko.

OL Reign, 2020–2021
Brooks was out of contract following the 2019 NWSL season and Houston Dash traded her rights to OL Reign. She subsequently signed a three-year contract with the Tacoma-based club on March 4, 2020.

Washington Spirit, 2022-Present 
Brooks signs one-year deal with the Washington Spirit.

International career
Brooks has competed on behalf of the United States in various national youth teams since 2007, including at the 2008 FIFA U-17 Women's World Cup. As a member of the U-20 national team, she represented the United States at the 2010 FIFA U-20 Women's World Cup in Germany and won the 2010 CONCACAF Women's U-20 Championship. She was a captain of the U-23 national team.

On November 10, 2013, Brooks made her debut for the U.S. WNT team against Brazil in a friendly; started in the match and played 81 minutes.

Career statistics
.

Honors
Bayern Munich
 Frauen-Bundesliga: 2014–15

Seattle Reign
 NWSL Shield: 2015

United States
 CONCACAF Women's U-20 Championship: 2012

See also

 List of University of North Carolina at Chapel Hill alumni
 List of recipients of Today's Top 10 Award

References

External links

 
 
 US Soccer player profile
 Portland Thorns FC player profile
 FC Bayern Munich player profile
 University of North Carolina player profile
 

Living people
1991 births
Vancouver Whitecaps FC (women) players
North Carolina Tar Heels women's soccer players
Parade High School All-Americans (girls' soccer)
American women's soccer players
Soccer players from New Jersey
FC Bayern Munich (women) players
Portland Thorns FC players
OL Reign players
United States women's international soccer players
Women's association football defenders
Women's association football midfielders
Houston Dash players
American expatriate soccer players in Germany
National Women's Soccer League players
Portland Thorns FC draft picks
United States women's under-20 international soccer players
New Jersey Wildcats players
People from New Hope, Pennsylvania
Sportspeople from Bucks County, Pennsylvania
The Pennington School alumni
Frauen-Bundesliga players
American expatriate women's soccer players
Washington Spirit players